This is a list of aircraft operators which are currently licensed by the Kazakh civil aviation authorities.

Scheduled airlines

Charter airlines

Cargo airlines

See also
 List of airlines
 List of defunct airlines of Kazakhstan
 List of defunct airlines of Asia
 List of airports in Kazakhstan

References

Kazakhstan
Airlines
Airlines
Kazakhstan
Kazakhstan